The following highways are numbered 324:

Brazil
 BR-324

Canada
 Nova Scotia Route 324
 Saskatchewan Highway 324

China
 China National Highway 324

Costa Rica
 National Route 324

Japan
 Japan National Route 324

United States
  Arkansas Highway 324
  Georgia State Route 324
  Louisiana Highway 324
  Maryland Route 324 (unsigned)
  Minnesota State Highway 324 (former)
  New Jersey Route 324
 New York:
  New York State Route 324
  County Route 324 (Erie County, New York)
  Ohio State Route 324
  Pennsylvania Route 324
  Puerto Rico Highway 324
  South Carolina Highway 324
  South Dakota Highway 324
  Texas State Highway 324 (former)
  Virginia State Route 324
 Virginia State Route 324 (former)
 Montana Highway 324